Earl Washington Jr. (born May 3, 1960) is a former Virginia death-row inmate, who was fully exonerated of murder charges against him in 2000. He had been wrongfully convicted and sentenced to death in 1984 for the 1982 rape and murder of Rebecca Lyn Williams in Culpeper, Virginia. Washington has an IQ estimated at 69, which classifies him as intellectually disabled. He was coerced into confessing to the crime when arrested on an unrelated charge a year later. He narrowly escaped being executed in 1985 and 1994.

Washington was scheduled for execution in September 1985 but a pro bono defense effort and appeal gained a stay while working to gain appeal of his conviction. Based on questions about his murder conviction raised in 1993 due to DNA testing, which had not been available at the time of trial, Washington's death sentence was commuted in 1994 by Governor Douglas Wilder to life imprisonment. In 2000 additional DNA testing was done, as new technology was available. Based on this, Washington was pardoned by Governor James Gilmore and released from prison. In 2006, he was awarded a settlement from the estate of Agent Curtis R. Wilmore, who had coerced Washington's confession. In 2007, he received a settlement from the state.

Background
In 1982, 19-year-old Rebecca Lynn Williams, mother of three, was raped and murdered in Culpeper, Virginia. In 1983 in neighboring Fauquier County, Virginia, Earl Washington Jr., a black man with a major intellectual disability, was arrested for and admitted to breaking into the home of and wounding a neighbor during a drunken dispute. Subsequently, police coerced confessions from Washington for the rape/murder and three other sexual assaults.  The other three charges were quickly disproven based on witness statements and physical evidence. The rape/murder case proceeded to trial based solely on the confession obtained after "days of police rehearsal and re-shaping" through leading questions and Washington agreeing to detectives' corrections when he got details of the crime, including the victim's race, and of the crime scene wrong.

With low-quality representation by defense counsel ⁠— ⁠his defense counsel had failed to discuss his intellectual disability as a mitigating factor during sentencing ⁠— ⁠Washington was convicted of Williams' capital murder and sentenced to death.

Review and appeals
After fellow death row inmate Joseph Giarratano took on his case in 1985, shortly before Washington's scheduled execution in September of that year, he noted the inmate's mental disability. Giarratano contacted Marie Deans, a volunteer advocate with whom he had worked, who enlisted pro bono help to gain a stay of execution.

Washington's defense attorneys gained approval in 1993 to conduct an analysis of DNA evidence from the crime scene. This showed that Washington could not have made the semen stain and raised doubt that he was responsible for the crimes for which he was sentenced. The appeals court refused to hear the case because Virginia has severe limitations on when new evidence can be introduced post-conviction. Nine days before Washington's rescheduled execution, Virginia's Governor Douglas Wilder commuted his sentence to life in prison.

In 2000, after more accurate DNA testing connected another man to the crime, Washington was exonerated, receiving a full pardon from Governor James Gilmore. Washington was represented by attorneys Robert T. Hall, Eric M. Freedman, Gerald Zerkin and Barry A. Weinstein.

In 2006, Washington was awarded $2.25 million from the estate of Agent Curtis R. Wilmore who had coerced the false confession from the defendant. In 2007, Washington, the state of Virginia, and Wilmore's estate agreed to a settlement whereby Washington was to receive $1.9 million for wrongful conviction from the state.

In 2007, Kenneth Tinsley, who was already serving a life sentence and had been identified in a review of the state DNA database as matching DNA from the crime scene, pleaded guilty to the rape and murder of Rebeca Lyn Williams.

Aftermath
Since Washington's exoneration, the United States Supreme Court ruled in Atkins v. Virginia (2002) that the death penalty for persons with intellectual disability was unconstitutional. It ordered states to review the cases of persons on death row who had been convicted and shown to have such disability, and to commute their sentences to appropriate lower levels of punishment.  Washington's case is frequently cited by opponents of the death penalty as an example of a wrongful conviction and death sentence. He is an innocent man who was narrowly saved from being executed.  Jerry Givens, the executioner who had been scheduled to take Washington's life in 1985, cited his exoneration as a major factor in his conversion to anti-death penalty campaigner.

See also
 List of wrongful convictions in the United States
 Legal ethics
 Exculpatory evidence
 Innocence Project
 List of miscarriage of justice cases
 Race in the United States criminal justice system
 Capital punishment in the United States
 Innocent prisoner's dilemma
 Miscarriage of justice
 False confession
 Overturned convictions in the United States

Notes

References 
"Know the Cases: Browse Profiles: Earl Washington" . The Innocence Project
Richmond Times-Dispatch
"Earl Washington, Jr", The Justice Project 
"Actual Killer in Earl Washington Case Pleads Guilty", The Innocence Project

1960 births
Living people
Overturned convictions in the United States
People from Virginia
People with intellectual disability
Recipients of American gubernatorial clemency
Recipients of American gubernatorial pardons
People convicted of murder by Virginia
Prisoners sentenced to death by Virginia